This is a list of fellows of the Engineering Institute of Canada (EIC).

References

 
Engineering Institute of Canada